Ulotrichopus macula is a moth of the family Erebidae. It is found in the Indian Subregion, Taiwan, Thailand, Sundaland, Sulawesi and Seram.

Subspecies
Ulotrichopus macula macula
Ulotrichopus macula reducta Prout, 1922 (Sulawesi and Seram)

References

External links
Species info

Ulotrichopus
Moths of Asia
Moths described in 1891